Beni Otsmane, is a village of Tunisia at Latitude36°49'0.01" Longitude10°37'59.99 lies on the Cape Bon peninsula  near the village of Sidi Rais and Korbous. Surrounded by the Qorbus Forest, the area has been popular as a health resort since Roman times.

The name is derived from the Banī ‘Uthmān Tribe that traditionally have lived in the area.

References

Roman towns and cities in Tunisia
Archaeological sites in Tunisia
Populated places in Tunisia